André Previn and Friends Play Show Boat is a 1995 album by André Previn of songs from the 1927 musical Show Boat.

Reception

The album was reviewed by Scott Yanow at Allmusic who wrote that aside from "Make Believe", which was "unusually sweet" Previn's "interpretations of the other pieces are melodic, respectful and swinging". Ray Brown and Grady Tate were praised by Yanow as being "typically excellent in support".

Track listing
"Make Believe" (Hammerstein, Kern) – 3:59
"Can't Help Lovin' Dat Man" (Hammerstein, Kern) – 5:02
"Ol' Man River" (Hammerstein, Kern) – 4:28
"Bill" (Hammerstein, Kern, PG Wodehouse) – 3:05 
"Lickety Split" (André Previn) – 5:54
"White Wood" (Previn) – 6:57
"Dr. DJ" (Evelyn Hawkins)" (Previn) – 3:03
"Life upon the Wicked Stage" (Hammerstein, Kern) – 5:36
"Why Do I Love You?" (Hammerstein, Kern) – 3:18
"I Might Fall Back on You" (Hammerstein, Kern) – 3:03
"Nobody Else But Me" (Hammerstein, Kern) – 4:34

Personnel
André Previn – piano
Mundell Lowe – guitar
Ray Brown – double bass
Grady Tate – drums

Production
Elizabeth Ostrow – editing, producer
Tom Lazarus – engineer
Alison Ames – executive producer
Miles Kreuger – illustrations
Christian Steiner – photography

References

1995 albums
André Previn albums
Deutsche Grammophon albums